Massaponax High School is a public school in Spotsylvania County, VA.  It is part of Spotsylvania County Public Schools and is located on 8211 Jefferson Davis Highway

History
Massaponax High School opened in the fall of 1998 becoming the fourth high school in Spotsylvania County.

Massaponax became one of the county's largest high schools and carries a current enrollment of 1,960 students in grades 9 through 12.

Location
Massaponax High School is located in Historic Spotsylvania County, consisting of  located in eastern Virginia, midway between the nation's capital of Washington, D.C. and the state capital of Richmond; both of which are approximately  distant. Both capital cities are readily accessible by rail and highway. Spotsylvania County is bordered by Caroline County to the south and east, Louisa to the west, and Hanover County to the southwest, along the North Anna River. Culpeper borders the northwest, and Stafford County to the north, while the City of Fredericksburg lies to the east and Orange County to the west, along the Rappahannock and Rapidan Rivers.

Athletics
Massaponax High School is part of the AAA Commonwealth District and AAA Northwest Region, and offers soccer, tennis, cheerleading, cross country, lacrosse, football, golf, volleyball, basketball, field hockey, swimming, wrestling, baseball, softball,  track and field, and gymnastics .

Massaponax's football team reached the State Finals in 2003 following an undefeated season, but lost.

The Massaponax Maniacs is a student organization dedicated to cheering on school teams.

Marching band
The marching band is known as the Marching Panther Pride (MP²).

Notable alumni
Caressa Cameron, beauty pageant titleholder, winner of Miss Virginia 2009 and Miss America 2010
DeAndre Houston-Carson, NFL player for Chicago Bears
The Head and the Heart bandmates Jonathan Russell and Tyler Williams attended MHS.
Greg Slaughter, Filipino-American professional basketball player
Kelvin Jones, Professional soccer player

See also
 List of high schools in Virginia
 AAA Commonwealth District

References

External links
 School Website
 Spotsylvania County Schools Website

Public high schools in Virginia
Spotsylvania County Public Schools
Educational institutions established in 1998
1998 establishments in Virginia